Nishnawbe Aski Nation (ᐊᓂᐦᔑᓈᐯ ᐊᔅᑭ ᐃᔥᑯᓂᑲᓇᓐ ᐅᑭᒫᐎᓐ (Anishinaabe-aski Ishkoniganan Ogimaawin), unpointed: ᐊᓂᔑᓇᐯ ᐊᔅᑭ ᐃᔥᑯᓂᐊᓇᓐ ᐅᑭᒪᐎᓐ; NAN for short) is a political organization representing 51 First Nation communities across Treaty 9 and Treaty 5 areas of Northern Ontario, Canada. Re-organized to its present form in 1981, NAN's original objective was "to represent the social and economic aspirations of our people at all levels of government in Canada and Ontario until such time as real effective action is taken to remedy our problems."

Its member-First Nations are Ojibwa, Oji-Cree and Cree, and thus the languages within NAN include Ojibwe, Oji-cree and Cree. NAN's administrative offices are located in Thunder Bay, Ontario. The current Grand Chief is Derek Fox.

History 
Founded as Grand Council of Treaty 9 in February, 1973, after a large anticipated deficit resulting from the anti-Reed Campaign and the Hart Commission of 1978, members of the Grand Council Treaty 9 re-organized in 1981 to become the Nishnawbe Aski Nation. After the first executive council of NAN was elected in March 1984, Grand Council Treaty No. 9 ceased to exist.

Current Leadership
Grand Chief Derek Fox

Deputy Grand Chief Anna Betty Achneepineskum 

Deputy Grand Chief Bobby Narcisse

Deputy Grand Chief Victor Linklater

Demographics and Geography

Nishnawbe Aski Nation represents 51 First Nation communities within northern Ontario. The total land-mass under James Bay Treaty No. 9 and Ontario’s portion of Treaty No. 5, which is covered by Nishnawbe Aski Nation, covers 2/3 of the province of Ontario. The land area is around 544,000 square km (210,000 square miles), which is around the same size as Yemen.

The  population of membership (on and off reserve) estimated around 45,000 people.

Departments 
 Administration
 Centennial Commemoration
 Communications and Media
 Crisis and Suicide Prevention
 Education
 Employment Opportunities
 Executive Council
 Fiscal Relations
 Governance Secretariat
 Harvesting Unit
 Health
 Infrastructure and Housing 
 Land Rights and Treaty
 Lands and Resources
 Residential School Project
 Social Services
 Treaty Discussion Forum
 Treaty Education Process
 Women's Council
 Youth

Programs 
 Aboriginal Diabetes Initiative
 Aboriginal Responsible Gambling Strategy
 AIDS and Healthy
 Chiropody Program
 Decade for Youth and Development
 Family Violence Project
 Fetal Alcohol Spectrum Disorder/Child Nutrition Program
 Healthy Babies / Healthy Children Program
 NAN Crisis Team Funding and Training
 Peer Helping Program
 Recreation
 Residential School Project

Affiliated First Nations
The 51 communities are grouped by Tribal Council according to region. They are Windigo First Nations Council, Wabun Tribal Council, Shibogama First Nations Council, Mushkegowuk Council, Matawa First Nations, Keewaytinook Okimakanak, and Independent First Nations Alliance. Three of the 51 communities are not affiliated with a specific Tribal Council.

Mishkeegogamang First Nation
MoCreebec Council of the Cree Nation
Sandy Lake First Nation
Independent First Nations Alliance
Kitchenuhmaykoosib Inninuwug First Nation (formerly known as Big Trout Lake First Nation)
Lac Seul First Nation
Muskrat Dam Lake First Nation
Pikangikum First Nation
Whitesand First Nation
Keewaytinook Okimakanak Council (ᑮᐌᑎᓅᐠ ᐅᑭᒫᐦᑲᓇᐠ (Giiwedinoog Ogimaakanag))
Deer Lake First Nation
Fort Severn First Nation
Keewaywin First Nation
McDowell Lake First Nation
North Spirit Lake First Nation
Poplar Hill First Nation
Matawa First Nations
Aroland First Nation
Constance Lake First Nation
Eabametoong First Nation
Hornepayne First Nation
Ginoogaming First Nation
Long Lake 58 First Nation
Marten Falls First Nation
Neskantaga First Nation (also known as Lansdowne House First Nation)
Nibinamik First Nation (also known as Summer Beaver First Nation)
Webequie First Nation
Mushkegowuk Council (ᐅᒪᐡᑫᑯ ᐅᑭᒫᐎᐎᐣ (Omashkeko Okimāwiwin); also known as Mushkegowuk Tribal Council)
Attawapiskat First Nation
Chapleau Cree First Nation
Fort Albany First Nation Fort Albany, Ontario (also known as Albany First Nation)
Kashechewan First Nation
Missanabie Cree First Nation
Moose Cree First Nation
Taykwa Tagamou Nation (formerly known as New Post First Nation)
Weenusk First Nation
Shibogama First Nations Council (ᔑᑄᑲᒫ ᓂᐢᑕᒼ ᐊᓂᐦᔑᓈᐯᐠ ᐅᓇᐦᔕᐌᓂᓂᐗᐠ (Zhibwagamaa Nistam-Anishinaabeg Onashaweniniwag))
Kasabonika First Nation
Kingfisher First Nation
Wapekeka First Nation
Wawakapewin First Nation
Wunnumin Lake First Nation
Wabun Tribal Council
Beaverhouse First Nation
Brunswick House First Nation
Chapleau Ojibway First Nation
Flying Post First Nation
Matachewan First Nation
Mattagami First Nation
Wahgoshig First Nation
Windigo First Nations Council
Bearskin Lake First Nation
Cat Lake First Nation Cat Lake, Ontario
Koocheching First Nation
North Caribou Lake First Nation
Sachigo Lake First Nation
Slate Falls First Nation
Whitewater First Nation

References

External links
Official website

 
Nishnawbe Aski Nation
Nishnawbe Aski Nation
Nishnawbe Aski Nation
Anishinaabe tribal political organizations
Anishinaabe tribal treaty administrants
Algonquian ethnonyms
First Nations organizations in Ontario
1981 establishments in Canada